Julius Dexter Rhodes (1 October 1841 - 19 February 1906) was a Sergeant Major in the United States Army who was awarded the Medal of Honor for gallantry during the American Civil War. After having his horse shot from under him at the Battle of Throughfare Gap, he helped the 105th New York Volunteers advance on the enemy line. He was later wounded while fighting in the Second Battle of Bull Run. He was awarded the Medal of Honor on 9 March 1887.

Personal life 
Rhodes was born on 1 October 1841 in Monroe, Michigan to parents Dexter B. Rhodes and Caroline N. Hall Rhodes. He was one of two children in the family. He married Ellen Marie Shaw in 1868 and fathered a daughter and three sons. Rhodes died on 19 February 1906 in Washington D.C. and is buried in Greenwood Cemetery in Pleasantville, New Jersey.

Military service 
At the beginning of the American Civil War, Rhodes was a student at the Springfield Institute in Erie, New York. He enlisted on 3 September 1861 as a private and a bugler for Company F of the 5th New York Cavalry. In action near Harrisburg, Virginia, he erroneously sounded a call to advance when he had been ordered to sound a call for retreat. Although his erroneous call led to a Union victory, he still lost rank. In August 1862, he was the only survivor of a 10-man group sent to destroy the Waterloo Bridge over the Rappahannock River. They succeeded in destroying the bridge. Still a private, he received the Medal of Honor for two actions between 28 and 30 August 1862. First, at the Battle of Throughfare Gap, he survived getting his horse shot out from under him and voluntarily joined the 105th New York Volunteers in advancing against the enemy lines. Second, he "demonstrated gallantry" at the Second Battle of Bull Run, where he was wounded. He was taken to Harewood Hospital in Washington D.C. and was soon discharged as disabled on 27 February 1863. After recovering, he travelled to New Orleans to care for his younger brother Julian, who had served with the 116th New York Volunteers. The two brothers later joined the First Louisiana Regimental Cavalry and saw action at Donnelsville. The elder Rhodes also served with the 31st Maine Volunteers. On 2 April 1865, he saw his final action at the Third Battle of Petersburg in Virginia, where he was pierced in the cheek with a bayonet, receiving a skull fracture and losing consciousness. He was hospitalized for the rest of the war.

Rhodes' Medal of Honor citation reads:

References 

1841 births
1906 deaths
United States Army Medal of Honor recipients
American Civil War recipients of the Medal of Honor